Joseph C. Harrington (December 21, 1869 in Fall River, Massachusetts – September 13, 1933) was a professional baseball third baseman. He played in Major League Baseball from 1895–1896 for the Boston Beaneaters. He became the fourth major league ballplayer to hit a home run in his first at bat.

See also
List of Major League Baseball players with a home run in their first major league at bat

Sources

1869 births
1933 deaths
19th-century baseball players
Boston Beaneaters players
Fall River Indians players
Meriden Silverites players
New Bedford Whalers (baseball) players
Norwich Reds players
Norwich Witches players
Sportspeople from Fall River, Massachusetts
Springfield Maroons players
Springfield Ponies players
Syracuse Stars (minor league baseball) players
Taunton Herrings players
Worcester Farmers players
Woonsocket (minor league baseball) players